Fusinus meteoris is a species of sea snail, a marine gastropod mollusk in the family Fasciolariidae, the spindle snails, the tulip snails and their allies.

Description
The length of the shell attains 48.8 mm.

Distribution
The holotype was found on a seamount at the Grand Banc Meteor, Northeast Atlantic Ocean.

References

 Gofas, S., 2000. Four species of the family Fasciolariidae (Gastropoda) from the north Atlantic seamounts. Journal of Conchology 37(1): 7-16

meteoris
Gastropods described in 2000